Grazac is a commune in the Haute-Garonne department in southwestern France.

Geography
The commune is bordered by four other communes: Auterive to the northeast, Caujac to the southeast, Esperce to the southwest, and finally by Mauressac to the northwest.

Population

The population of the commune only had 87 people in 1962, then it was increased to 125 in 1968, 210 in 1982, 366 in 1990, 442 in 1999, and reached its current population of 691 people in 2019.

See also
Communes of the Haute-Garonne department

References

Communes of Haute-Garonne